Arthur Frank Warren (born March 23, 1993) is an American professional baseball pitcher in the New York Yankees organization. He has previously played for the Seattle Mariners and Cincinnati Reds.

Career

Amateur career
Warren attended Napoleon High School in Napoleon, Ohio and played college baseball at the University of Cincinnati and Ashland University. He was drafted by the Seattle Mariners in the 23rd round of the 2015 Major League Baseball draft.

Seattle Mariners
Warren made his professional debut with the Arizona League Mariners and pitched seven innings for them, giving up three runs and striking out ten. He started 2016 with the Clinton LumberKings and was promoted to the Bakersfield Blaze during the season. In 27 total games between the two teams, he posted an 11-2 record with a 3.17 ERA. He pitched 2017 with Bakersfield where he pitched to a 3-1 record, 3.06 ERA, and 1.28 WHIP in 43 games. After the season pitched in the Arizona Fall League.

In 2018, Warren pitched for the Arkansas Travelers, going 1-2 with a 1.72 ERA in only  innings due to injury. He returned to Arkansas to begin 2019, going 2–1 with a 1.71 ERA.

The Mariners selected Warren's contract and promoted him to the major leagues on September 10, 2019. He made his major league debut on September 12 versus the Cincinnati Reds, pitching a scoreless  of an inning.

Texas Rangers
On October 21, 2020, Warren was claimed off waivers by the Texas Rangers. On December 26, 2020, Warren was designated for assignment by Texas.

Cincinnati Reds
On January 6, 2021, Warren was traded to the Cincinnati Reds in exchange for cash considerations. On August 11, Warren was placed on the 60-day injured list with an oblique injury.

On May 15, 2022, Warren relieved Hunter Greene in the eighth inning of a no-hitter against the Pittsburgh Pirates. Warren didn't allow a hit, but he allowed a run on a fielder's choice. The Pirates won the game 1-0 the next half inning, which prevented the no-hitter from becoming official due to the Pirates not needing to bat in the bottom of the ninth. On November 15, Warren was designated for assignment. On November 18, he was non tendered and became a free agent.

New York Yankees
On December 13, 2022, Warren signed a minor league deal with the New York Yankees.

References

External links

1993 births
Living people
African-American baseball players
People from Defiance, Ohio
Baseball players from Ohio
Major League Baseball pitchers
Seattle Mariners players
Cincinnati Reds players
Cincinnati Bearcats baseball players
Ashland Eagles baseball players
Ashland University alumni
Arizona League Mariners players
Clinton LumberKings players
Bakersfield Blaze players
Modesto Nuts players
Arkansas Travelers players
Peoria Javelinas players
Louisville Bats players
21st-century African-American sportspeople